My Great Big Adventure is an Australian children's television series aired on ABC3 on 29 January 2012. It is presented by Kayne Tremills.
The program deals with many life issues concerning teenagers.

A second series aired from 6 September 2014, with Kayne Tremills bringing along three presenter friends, Stephanie Bendixsen, Nancy Denis and Takaya Honda.

Ratings

Australian Broadcasting Corporation original programming
Australian children's television series
2012 Australian television series debuts
2012 Australian television series endings